RCMP Nadon is a Commissioner-class high-speed patrol vessel previously operated by the Royal Canadian Mounted Police's Marine Division.

In 2000 Nadon was temporarily renamed St. Roch II in order to recreate the 1950 voyage of the RCMP schooner St. Roch around the North American continent. The voyage began at Vancouver on 1 July 2000, and involved navigating the Northwest Passage around the northern coast of Canada as far as Halifax. She was accompanied by the Coast Guard ship , as a support vessel.

St. Roch II also carried out a search for a reported wreck from Sir John Franklin's expedition of 1845. Using a Kongsberg/Simrad SM2000 forward-looking sonar she completed a survey west of Grant Point on the Adelaide Peninsula.

The St. Roch II then continued down the eastern seaboard of the U.S., across the Caribbean to transit the Panama Canal before returning to Vancouver in December. The voyage was a joint project of the RCMP and the Vancouver Marine Museum to raise funds to help maintain and preserve the original St. Roch.

Having reverted to her original name Nadon continued in service with the RCMP until its recent decommissioning.

References

External links
 

Royal Canadian Mounted Police